Aliuska Ojeda (born 25 March 1992) is a Cuban judoka who has won medals in the 2015 Pan American Games and the Pan American Judo Championships in 2014 and 2017.

Medals

References

External links
 

Living people
1992 births
Cuban female judoka
Pan American Games medalists in judo
Pan American Games bronze medalists for Cuba
Judoka at the 2015 Pan American Games
Medalists at the 2015 Pan American Games
20th-century Cuban women
21st-century Cuban women